This is a list of Swedish football clubs in European competition. Swedish clubs have participated since 1955, when Djurgårdens IF entered the 1955–56 European Cup.

Statistics

 Most European Cup/Champions League competitions appeared in: 15 – IFK Göteborg
 Most UEFA Cup/Europa League competitions appeared in: 15 – IF Elfsborg
 Most Cup Winners' Cup competitions appeared in: 5, joint record – AIK, Malmö FF and IFK Norrköping
 Most Intertoto Cup competitions appeared in: 3 – Örgryte IS
 Most competitions appeared in overall: 34 – Malmö FF
 First match played: Djurgårdens IF 0–0 Gwardia Warszawa, 20 September 1955 (1955–56 European Cup first round)
 Most matches played: 154 – IFK Göteborg
 Most match wins: 67 – IFK Göteborg
 Most match draws: 33 – IFK Göteborg
 Most match losses: 58 – Malmö FF

 Biggest win (match): 11 goals – Malmö FF 11–0 Pezoporikos Larnaca (1973–74 European Cup Winners' Cup first round)
 Biggest win (aggregate): 17 goals – IFK Göteborg 17–0 Avenir Beggen (1984–85 European Cup first round)
 Biggest defeat (match): 8 goals – Real Madrid 8–0 Malmö FF (2015–16 UEFA Champions League group stage)
 Biggest defeat (aggregate): 9 goals – IFK Göteborg 2–11 Feyenoord (1961–62 European Cup preliminary round)

UEFA coefficient and ranking
For the 2023–24 UEFA competitions, the associations will be allocated places according to their 2022 UEFA country coefficients, which take into account their performance in European competitions from 2017–18 to 2021–22. In the 2022 rankings used for the 2023–24 European competitions, Sweden's coefficient points total is 22.875. After earning a score of 5.125 during the 2021–22 European campaign, Sweden is ranked by UEFA as the 23rd best association in Europe out of 55 – staying in the same position as the previous season.

 21  26.375
 22  24.375
 23  22.875
 24  19.500
 25  17.150
 Full list

Appearances in UEFA competitions

Updated: 8 September 2022, * currently in indicated competition.
EC – European Cup, ECWC – European Cup Winner's Cup, UIC – UEFA Intertoto Cup, UC – UEFA Cup, UCL – UEFA Champions League, UEL – UEFA Europa League, UECL – UEFA Europa Conference League.

Active competitions

UEFA Champions League

UEFA Europa League

UEFA Europa Conference League

Defunct competitions

UEFA Cup Winners' Cup

UEFA Intertoto Cup

Non-UEFA competitions

Inter-Cities Fairs Cup

References

External links
UEFA Website
Rec.Sport.Soccer Statistics Foundation
Svensk Fotboll

 
European football clubs in international competitions